Pankaja Munde (born 26 July 1979), also known by her married name Pankaja Munde-Palwe, is an Indian politician from the state of Maharashtra and National Secretary of Bharatiya Janata Party (BJP).

Early life 

Pankaja Munde was born to Gopinath Munde and Pradnya Munde on 26 July 1979 as their eldest child. She has two younger sisters, Pritam Munde and Yashashari. She completed her graduation and also holds an MBA. She is a niece of Pramod Mahajan, and a cousin to Rahul Mahajan and Poonam Mahajan.

Political career

Her father Gopinath Munde was Deputy CM of Maharashtra in the 1990s. Pankaja Munde was the Minister of Rural and Women, Child Development in the Devendra Fadnavis cabinet. She is known as a 'businesswoman' in the Sugar Factory sector & Bank sector. She received 'The Powerful Politician' award in the year 2017 and one of the mass and firebrand leaders from Maharashtra state.

Pankaja Munde served as the State President of BJP's youth wing, the Bharatiya Janata Yuva Morcha (BJYM), in 2012. She was elected to the Legislative Assembly of Maharashtra from Parli constituency in 2009. She took oath as Maharashtra Cabinet Minister on 31 October 2014. She was allotted Ministry of Rural Development, Women & Child welfare.

Before 2014 Maharashtra assembly election, Maharashtra BJP announced a two-week "Punha Sangharsh Yatra" which was planned party & led by Pankaja Munde along the lines of a Sangharsh Yatra undertaken by her father in 1995 after which the Shiv Sena-BJP came to power in the state. The 14 days long yatra started on 27 August 2014. Politicians like Amit Shah, Smriti Irani, Rajiv Pratap Rudy attended this Yatra. Pankaja Munde covered 79 assembly constituencies by doing 600 rallies and 3500 km of road journey. ‘Punha Sangharsh Yatra’ got an overwhelming response. At rally supporters of Pankaja Munde chairing for her as chief minister post at Amit Shah's rally, when Amit Shah said we planned for Gopinath Munde as chief minister if party get power in state. But she said she never aspired or planned to pitch herself as chief minister face.

She said she just wanted to play a key role in ensuring the BJP comes to power. During her tour and during the poll campaigns, people  said she should take her father's place.But she always said that she likes to be the kingmaker, not the king. Purpose of her Yatra was to ensure the state gets a BJP government and a CM.

She is also known for arranging a memorial of her father and senior BJP leader, Gopinath Munde, at Parli in Beed district. The 20-feet tall statue of him, called Gopinath Gad is also known as a 'tomb of father by daughter.' It was commenced after his death in a 2014 road accident and is sited on the premises of the Vaidyanath Cooperative Sugar Mill. Inauguration done by Amit Shah, Devendra Fadnavis. Social activities, drought relief, skill development, education scholarship & many such activities have been started to conducting through 'Gopinath Gad' Prathisthan.

Honouring the late party leader Gopinath Munde, Government of India unveiled a special postal cover on his Seventh death anniversary. The cover of this post inaugurated in the presence of BJP National President JP Nadda, Union Telecom Minister Ravi Shankar Prasad virtually. it was Mass leader Gopinath Munde who laid the foundation for taking the party to Dalits and deprived classes of the state which is why the BJP is the biggest party in Maharashtra today.

The year 2022 started with victory crown for Pankaja Munde as she has upper hand in nagar panchayat election in the Beed district. In the Beed district, BJP emerged as only winner by getting victory in all the 4 Nagar Panchayat and BJP became the top party by bagging maximum seats under her leadership. For Pankaja Munde as she has credited for the party's success in this polls, her winning of local self-governing bodies is indicative of public mandate ahead of other crucial polls in the future.

Political Allegation 
In June 2015, the opposition party Indian National Congress accused her of being involved in the chikki scam, alleging that she had flouted norms by clearing the purchase without floating tenders. Munde rejected the accusations of corruption, arguing that a policy for an online tendering system was not in place when she commissioned the purchase. Chief Minister Devendra Fadnavis also defended her, stating that the norm of inviting e-tenders was introduced by his government in April, two months after Munde cleared the contracts.  She challenge opposition if proven guilty “I shall not just resign, but quit politics permanently if I’ve taken even a rupee from anyone,”  the daughter of late BJP veteran Gopinath Munde.
 
After a few days, Anti Corruption Bureau, Maharashtra gave a clean chit to Pankaja Munde in connection with the 206 crore Chikki scandal alleged by the opposition and said the tender was given in compliance with the court's rules, with no facts in this regard.

The Bombay high court (HC) rapped the state government for not registering a first information report (FIR) against contractors who allegedly supplied sub-standard chikki to state-run schools in 2015. The bench asked the petitioner to give a list of points as to how the procedure of awarding contracts for chikki was not followed. “Focus on procedural aspects and see whether the procedure was as per norms. See whether it was tainted or an illegal contract and if contractors were ineligible. We can go into the question of inferior quality of the product at a later stage,” said the bench. Court said, “Why are there no offences registered under the Food Safety Act against the suppliers?

Personal life

Pankaja married to Amit Palwe. The couple has one son name as Aryaman. She has authored a photobiography of her father, titled Lokneta Gopinath Munde.

Dasara (Dussehra) Melava 

The tradition of Dasara (Dussehra) Melava is of devotion and strength, and this tradition was started by Gopinath Munde twenty-five years ago at Bhagwangad, which is the cemetery and workplace of the great Saint Bhagwan Baba.
For this Melava, Gopinath Munde addressed the Bahujan community to set new directions and conditions, i.e., 'Shimoullanghan';  To start something new.

After his death, the place was taken over by his successor daughter Pankaja Munde. In 2016, Pankaja Munde decided to take Dasara Melava at Savargaon, the birthplace of great Saint Bhagwan Baba, due to a dispute with the Mahant of the Gad.
The Dasara Melava which took place in a large crowd and enthusiasm;  Pankaja Munde has been successful in making the same melava in Savargaon.

Bhagwangad is a place of power of the Bahujan and Other Backward Class OBC community. So far, as many people have attended the rally and addressed the gathering;  include veterans like Sambhaji Raje , Amit Shah, Prakash Yashwant Ambedkar , Mahadev Jankar, Eknath Khadse, Ram Shinde many other monk-saint.

Every year, lakh of devotees and supporters participate in this rally with great enthusiasm.

References

External links
 Official Website

Maharashtra MLAs 2009–2014
Bharatiya Janata Party politicians from Maharashtra
People from Beed district
Living people
Maharashtra MLAs 2014–2019
State cabinet ministers of Maharashtra
People from Marathwada
Marathi politicians
21st-century Indian women politicians
21st-century Indian politicians
Women state cabinet ministers of India
1979 births
Women members of the Maharashtra Legislative Assembly